Vitaly Vasilyevich Fedorchuk (27 December 1918 – 29 February 2008) was a Ukrainian Soviet security and intelligence officer and politician.

Early life and education
Born in 1918 to a poor Ukrainian peasant family in the village of Ogievka, located in the Zhitomir region of Ukraine, Fedorchuk started working at a local newspaper at the age of 16. He was called up for military service in 1936 and graduated from the Military Signals and Communications School in Kyiv. Initially a signals officer in the Red Army, in 1939 he was recruited by the NKVD as a full-time operative.

Security and intelligence officer
At the beginning of his career as a state security officer, Fedorchuk was assigned to the People's Republic of Mongolia, where he fought in the victorious Battle of Khalkhin Gol against the Japanese. He then served as special assistant to the operational commissar of the Special Department of the NKVD of the Urals Military District. After the start of the Great Patriotic War, he became deputy chief of the Special Department of the NKVD attached to the 82nd Motorized Rifle Division of the Red Army and then, from 1942 to 1943, he was chief of the Special Department of the NKVD attached to the Armor Brigades on the North Caucasus Front. Between 1943 and 1949 he served as deputy chief of military counterintelligence (SMERSH) in Yaroslavl.

In 1949 he was assigned as a military counterintelligence officer on the Central Group of Forces in Soviet-occupied Austria. Then he worked in East Germany and again in Austria (since 1955 free from military occupation), in the Soviet Embassy in Vienna, until 1967, under diplomatic cover. In 1967, he was appointed Director of the Third Directorate (military counterintelligence) of the KGB where he served until 1970.

For a period of 12 years, between 18 July 1970 and 26 May 1982, Fedorchuk served as Chairman of the Ukrainian KGB. In this capacity, he led a fierce suppression of Ukrainian nationalism. He was appointed Chairman of the KGB on 26 May 1982, replacing Yuri Andropov, and served for seven months until 17 December 1982.

He then became the Soviet Interior Minister in December 1982, replacing Brezhnev's man Nikolai Shchelokov. His term ended in January 1986 (Mikhail Gorbachev had him replaced due to his opposition to the policies of the new Soviet leadership) and he was succeeded by Alexander V. Vlasov. After leaving the Interior Ministry, Fedorchuk became an Inspector at the Ministry of Defense, a largely honorary post, and then, he retired.

Death and burial
Fedorchuk died in Moscow on 29 February 2008 at the age of 89. His body was buried at Moscow's Troyekurovskoye cemetery.

References

1918 births
2008 deaths
People from Zhytomyr Oblast
Soviet politicians
Soviet Ministers of Internal Affairs
Recipients of the Order of Polonia Restituta (1944–1989)
KGB chairmen
Burials in Troyekurovskoye Cemetery
Republican KGB chairmen (Ukraine)